Dança dos Famosos (lit. Dance of the Famous) is a Brazilian dance competition show. It premiered on November 20, on TV Globo as a one-hour segment on Domingão do Faustão, hosted by Fausto Silva.

Format
The show pairs a number of celebrities with professional ballroom dancers who each week compete against each other in a competition to impress a panel of judges and the viewing audience in order to survive potential elimination.

Through telephone voting and social media viewers are able to score each couple based on their performance in a scale ranging from 5 (being the worst) to 10 (being the best). Each guest judge also scored based on the same scale.

The couple receiving the lowest combined total of judges' and audience's scores is eliminated each week until only the champion dance pair remains.

Past celebrity contestants have included professional and Olympic athletes, models, actors, singers and TV hosts.

Series overview

References

External links
 Official Site 

 
TV Globo original programming
Ballroom dance
2005 Brazilian television series debuts
Brazilian reality television series
Portuguese-language television shows
Brazilian television series based on British television series